The Republican Liberty Caucus (RLC) is a political action organization dedicated to promoting the ideals of individual liberty, limited government and free market economics within the Republican Party in the United States. It is part of the libertarian wing of the Republican Party. It also operates a political action committee, the RLC-USA PAC.

The organization was founded in 1991 and has chapters in many states. In 2011, the organization hosted its National Convention in Arlington, Virginia. The 2013 convention was held in Austin, Texas and the 2015 National Convention was hosted in Nashua, New Hampshire.

Issues
The RLC works within the Republican Party to influence the party to adopt the RLC's agenda. As activist Tom Heitman put it, "We're trying to reintroduce the Republican platform to the Republican Party."

The RLC favors individual freedom and limited government. Specifically, the RLC favors reduced government intrusion, lower taxes, elimination of federal agencies, less regulation, a strong national defense with fewer military bases abroad, and no foreign aid.

In 2010, the Republican Liberty Caucus of Texas denounced the new state Republican Party platform that supported criminalization of sodomy and making same-sex marriage a felony.

Leadership

Endorsements

Presidential endorsements
The Republican Liberty Caucus' process for endorsing presidential candidates is described in the organization's Bylaws and Rules:
A candidate for President of the United States may be endorsed by the Caucus by a 2/3 vote of the active and voting Chartered state's executive committees. The national Secretary shall notify all Chartered states of a favorable national board proposal for endorsement and state executive officers shall inform the Secretary of the approval or denial by their executive committee within 60 days.

Since the Caucus' founding in 1991, only three candidates have reached this level of support: Steve Forbes 1996, Ron Paul in 2012 and Rand Paul in 2016. When Forbes ran again in 2000, the organization remained neutral in that primary and did not endorse another specific Republican candidate in any presidential primary until December 30, 2011 when the RLC endorsed Ron Paul for President. In 2016, his son Rand Paul was also endorsed by the RLC.

Notable 2012 endorsements

On November 2, 2011, the Republican Liberty Caucus announced its first two endorsements in the 2012 election: Barry Hinckley, ran in the Republican primary in Rhode Island, and Brian K. Hill, ran in the Republican primary in Connecticut. The Republican nominee in Rhode Island challenged Democratic United States Senator Sheldon Whitehouse while the Republican nominee in Connecticut ran for an open seat being vacated by independent United States Senator Joseph Lieberman.

Republican Presidential Candidate Ron Paul from Texas
Ted Cruz of Texas for U.S. Senate
Barry Hinckley of Rhode Island for U.S. Senate
U.S. Representative Tom McClintock for California's Congressional District 4
Judge Executive Thomas Massie for Kentucky's Congressional District 4
U.S. Representative Justin Amash for Michigan's Congressional District 3
Kerry Bentivolio for Michigan's Congressional District 11
Sheriff Richard Mack for Texas' Congressional District 21
Steve Stockman for Texas' Congressional District 36
Karen Kwiatkowski for Virginia's Congressional District 6
Floyd Bayne for Virginia's Congressional District 7
Dan Halloran for New York's Congressional District 6

Notable 2014 endorsements
Matt Bevin of Kentucky for U.S. Senate
Milton R. Wolf of Kansas for U.S. Senate
Owen Hill of Colorado for U.S. Senate
Lee Bright of South Carolina for U.S. Senate
Pat McGeehan of West Virginia for U.S. Senate
Bruce Poliquin for Maine's 2nd congressional district

Notable 2016 endorsements
Republican Presidential Candidate Rand Paul from Kentucky

Notable 2018 endorsements
Eric Brakey of Maine for U.S. Senate
Austin Petersen of Missouri for U.S. Senate
Nick Freitas of Virginia for U.S. Senate

See also

References

External links
Republican Liberty Caucus official site

Classical liberalism
Republican Party (United States) organizations
Libertarian organizations based in the United States
Tea Party movement